Dolichopus sexarticulatus is a species of long-legged fly in the family Dolichopodidae.

References

sexarticulatus
Articles created by Qbugbot
Insects described in 1864
Taxa named by Hermann Loew